Ogasawarana obtusa is an extinct species of snail from Chichi-jima, Ogasawara, Japan. The holotype and paratypes are from 720 years BP. It has approximately 3.5 whorls. The surface of the shell is smooth, with fine growth lines and no spiral lines.

References

Endemic fauna of Japan
Gastropods described in 2008